Daniel Oliver may refer to:
 Daniel Oliver (botanist) (1830–1916), British botanist
 Daniel Oliver (physician) (1787–1842), American physician
 Daniel Oliver (policymaker) (born 1939), chairman of US Federal Trade Commission
 Daniel C. Oliver (1865–1924), American U.S. Representative for New York
 Daniel T. Oliver, United States Navy officer
 Dan Oliver, Australian visual effects supervisor

See also